Indian Oaks is an unincorporated community in Kankakee County, in the U.S. state of Illinois.

History
Variant names were "La Prairie" and "Tucker". A post office called Tucker was established in 1875, and remained in operation until 1909. The "Tucker" name was after J. F. Tucker, a railroad official.

References

Unincorporated communities in Kankakee County, Illinois